The Uzbekistan national rugby union team is a member of World Rugby and has yet to play in a Rugby World Cup tournament. The Uzbekistan Rugby Federation was established in 2001 and became a full member of World Rugby in 2014.

Record

Overall

Squad 
Squad to 2019 Asia Rugby Championship 
Head coach:  Malkhaz Maghlaperidze

References

External links

 Uzbekistan Rugby

 Uzbekistan on World Rugby

Asian national rugby union teams
Uzbekistani rugby union teams